The State Council was a body of state power in the Socialist Republic of Romania from 1961 to 1989. It was the collective head of state before the creation of the office of President in 1974.

Powers

1961–1974
The State Council was created in 1961 with an amendment to the 1952 Constitution, replacing the Presidium of the Great National Assembly.  It consisted of a president, three vice presidents and thirteen members.  By the end of the Communist era, it comprised a president, four vice presidents, a secretary and 15 members.

According to Article 63 of the 1965 Constitution, the State Council was "the supreme organ of state power (i. e., the GNA) in permanent session."  It was elected by the GNA from among its members and held office for the GNA's duration—in practice, five years.  As with all government bodies in Romania, it was nominally subordinate to the GNA.  In practice, by 1989, all but two of its members were also members of the Central Committee of the Romanian Communist Party and also held important party posts.

The Constitution vested the State Council with two kinds of power. Article 63 detailed the powers that were permanently vested in the State Council, such as:

Setting election dates
Ratifying any treaty that didn't entail changing Romanian law (all treaties that amended laws could only be approved by the GNA)
Organizing referendums
Appointing and recalling the commander of the armed forces and the heads of state organs
Granting citizenship, amnesty and asylum
Representing the state in international relations
Appointing diplomatic representatives
Establishing military ranks
Establishing decorations and honorary titles

Article 64 delegated some of the GNA's prerogatives to the State Council when that body was not in session, or in case of emergency. When the GNA was not in session, the State Council was empowered to set guidelines for the laws and supervise the local councils.  It could also issue governmental regulations in lieu of law.  If such regulation was not approved by the GNA at its next session, it was considered revoked.  In exceptional circumstances, the State Council could also exercise control over the budget and economic plan, appoint and dismiss ministers and justices of the Supreme Court, mobilize the armed forces and declare war.  In practice, the GNA's infrequent meetings (it only sat for twice a year) as well as the philosophy of democratic centralism meant that the State Council's decisions had the force of law.

Article 68 stated that all State Council decisions were to be made collectively. However, outside of Romania, the president of the State Council was reckoned as the country's head of state. Whenever the leader of the Communist Party was also State Council president (e.g., Gheorghe Gheorghiu-Dej from 1961 to 1965, and Nicolae Ceaușescu from 1967 to 1974), he derived his real power from his party post–an arrangement analogous to the current power structure in China, where the country's paramount leader serves as President, but derives his real power from his post as party leader.

1974 amendments
The State Council's prerogatives were significantly reduced by constitutional amendments passed in 1974.  Most notably, its presidency was upgraded to a full-fledged executive post, the President of the Republic.  He continued to serve as ex officio president of the State Council, and was empowered to act on any matter that didn't require a plenary session of that body.  He also assumed several powers that had previously been vested in the State Council as a whole, including conducting international relations and appointing and dismissing ministers and the heads of central agencies.  When the GNA was not in session, the president could appoint and dismiss the president of the Supreme Court and the prosecutor general without State Council approval; indeed, under the 1974 amendments the president was not even required to consult his State Council colleagues when making such decisions.  The State Council also lost the right to grant citizenship and asylum and to appoint the supreme commander of the armed forces.  It also lost the right to grant amnesty when the GNA was in session.

In practice, after 1974 the State Council was largely emasculated by Ceaușescu, who served as both leader of the Communist Party and President of the Republic.  By using his power to act on all issues that didn't require a formal plenum, he frequently ruled by decree.  He also usurped many of the State Council's powers, including the power to grant citizenship and asylum.  However, his control over the country was so absolute that no one dared object.

List of presidents of the State Council

List of vice presidents of the State Council

()

References

 
Government of Romania
Socialist Republic of Romania
1961 establishments in Romania
1989 disestablishments in Romania